The Best Buono! is a greatest hits album by Japanese girl idol group Buono! It was released on 10 August 2010 on the label Pony Canyon.

Release 
The album was released in two versions: a regular edition and a limited edition. The limited edition included an additional CD and an additional DVD.  The CD included in both editions, the regular and the limited, contains the A-sides of 8 of the 10 singles released by Buono! by that time (the ones excluded are the 4th single "Gachinko de Ikō!" and the 6th single "Co-no-Mi-chi".  The second CD included in the limited edition contains the B-sides of all 10 singles released by Buono! by that time.

Chart performance 
The album debuted at number 16 in the Japanese Oricon weekly albums chart.

Track listing

Charts

References

External links 
 Profile of the album on the official website of Hello! Project

Buono! albums
2010 compilation albums
Pony Canyon albums
Japanese-language albums